Edwin "Ed" Yancey Argo (September 22, 1895 – March 10, 1962) was an American horse rider who competed in the 1932 Summer Olympics.

Argo was born in Hollis, Alabama, on September 22, 1895. He received an appointment to the U.S. Military Academy at West Point, New York, and started school there in 1915. When World War One began, he dropped out of school and enlisted in the Army as a private on May 12, 1917. After the war, in 1919, he returned to the Military Academy and graduated as a second lieutenant.

Argo was a field artillery officer in the U.S. Army at a time that the horse was as prominent a part of a successful unit as in a cavalry unit. In 1921, he married Marguerite Hughes of Texas and was transferred to the 8th Training Battery from the 82nd Field Artillery. In 1925, he was stationed at Fort Sill, Oklahoma, which was the home of the U.S. Army School of Fires. In 1928, he was selected to the military equestrian team that took part in a competition in Amsterdam, Netherlands. He returned to Europe in 1930 for the competition in Hamburg, Germany.

Now-Captain Argo entered Army, Field Artillery and American history books when he competed in the 1928 and 1932 Olympics in Los Angeles, Cali.

In 1932 he and his horse Honolulu Tom Boy shared the gold medal as members of the American Three-Day Event team in the team eventing competition after finishing eighth at the 1928 Summer Olympics. The three-man team for the Three-Day Event was made up of Argo, Maj. Harry Chamberlin and 1st Lt. Earl Foster Thomson, both of the 9th Cavalry Regiment, Fort Riley, Kansas. The three faced the best military riders of Holland, Sweden, Japan and Mexico.

On the first day of the event, all riders faced a training test. The second day was an endurance ride of 22 ½ miles over five different courses and the last day was stadium jumping where riders a course of 12 jumps at a 14-mile per hour gait.

Argo, the only field artillery officer in this part of the competition, rode Honolulu Tom Boy in a remarkable performance without a fault at a jump during the stadium jumping—the only rider without a fault that day. The U.S. team led from the start and was described by the 1932 Field Artillery Journal as a “glorious achievement for our riders and horses,” as they took the gold medal. In the individual standings, Thomson took the silver for the U.S., Chamberlin finished fourth and Argo eighth.

Argo continued his Army career long after his Olympic glory days. He was transferred to Fort Humphreys, D.C., on April 20, 1939, and promoted to major a few months later. He then served at Fort Riley, Kansas, and Camp Beauregard, Louisiana. Argo was promoted to lieutenant colonel at Camp Beauregard on April 20, 1941, and to full colonel soon after — February 1, 1942.

Argo retired after 27 years military service on December 31, 1944, and took up residence in Louisiana. He died in Shreveport, Louisiana, at the age of 66 on March 10, 1962.

External links
http://sill-www.army.mil/firesbulletin/archives/1932/SEP_OCT_1932/SEP_OCT_1932_FULL_EDITION.pdf
profile

1895 births
1962 deaths
American event riders
American male equestrians
Equestrians at the 1932 Summer Olympics
Olympic gold medalists for the United States in equestrian
Medalists at the 1932 Summer Olympics